The Imatra Circuit is a motorsport street circuit in Imatra, Finland. The circuit has existed in two versions, and has been exclusively used for the "Imatranajo" motorcycle road race. From 1962 to 1978 a  clockwise street circuit in the east of the town of Imatra was used. The circuit ran along the Vuoksi river and a railway line that had to be crossed. From 1979 to 1986 a shorter circuit was used.

From the 1964 season until the 1982 season the Grand Prix of Finland was run 19 times in Imatra. From the 1983 season the "Imatranajo" lost its World Championship status due to the dangerous nature of the circuit and the death of sidecar driver Jock Taylor in 1982.

The last road race on the Imatra Circuit for many years was held in 1986 when a six-year-old boy died after falling under a running wheel, but classic races still took place. Road racing returned to Imatra in August 2016 with a round of the International Road Racing Championship, and another round was held in 2017. In the "Imatranajo" on June 15, 2019, a fatal crash occurred when a Swiss driver Mathias Gnägi with a Superbike class dropped off the track in the rain and was killed.

Lap records

The official race lap records at the Jarno Saarinen Imatranajo Circuit are listed as:

Finnish Grand Prix results

From 1964 to 1972

From 1973 to 1982 
(Coloured background = the race was boycotted by international competitors)

References and notes

 Translated from the Dutch version of this page

External links
Imatranajo website 

Motorsport venues in Finland
Grand Prix motorcycle circuits